Metro Group of Hospitals is an Indian hospital network with 10 NABH and 4 NABL accredited hospitals operational across India. With 2,500 beds, the hospital network is the largest tertiary care provider in the region.

Founder 
The hospital system was founded in 1997 by Dr. Purshotam Lal, an Indian cardiologist who also serves as the chairman and director of Interventional Cardiology at the hospital. Dr. Lal has been awarded the Padma Vibhushan (2009), Padma Bhushan, and Padma Shree. He specializes in non-surgical closure of heart holes (ASD/VSD), non-surgical replacement of valves, and treatment of multiple sclerosis.

Hospitals in the Network 

 Metro Hospitals & Heart Institute, Noida-12, UP
 Metro Hospitals & Heart Institute, Sector-11, UP
 Metro Hospital & Cancer Institute, Preet Vihar, Delhi
 Metro Hospital & Heart Institute, Lajpat Nagar, Delhi
 Metro Hospital & Heart Institute, Gurugram, Haryana
 RLKC Metro Hospital & Heart Institute, Pandav Nagar, Delhi
 Heart Institute & Multispecialty, Faridabad, Delhi NCR
 Metro Hospital & Heart Institute, Haridwar, Uttarakhand
 Metro MAS Hospital, Jaipur, Rajasthan
 Metro Hospital & Heart Institute, Meerut, UP
 Metro Hospital & Heart Institute, Rewari, Haryana
 Metro Hospital & Research Institute, Vadodara, Gujarat

References
Dr. Purshotam Lal - Transforming healthcare with a vision Envisioning a healthy India, Metro Group of Hospitals. Yahoo News, 12th October 2020

डॉ. पुरूषोत्तम लाल ने किया मेट्रो अस्पताल को पूर्ण रूप से टेकओवर. Amar Ujala

https://www.wefornews.com/arrest-warrant-issued-against-chairman-of-metro-hospital-group/

External links 
 

Hospitals in Haryana
1997 establishments in Uttar Pradesh
Hospitals established in 1997